John Elliotson (29 October 1791 – 29 July 1868), M.D. (Edinburgh, 1810), M.D.(Oxford, 1821), F.R.C.P.(London, 1822), F.R.S. (1829), professor of the principles and practice of medicine at University College London (1832), senior physician to University College Hospital (1834) — and, in concert with William Collins Engledue M.D., the co-editor of The Zoist.

Elliotson was a prolific and influential author, a respected teacher, and renowned for his diagnostic skills as a clinician and, especially, his extremely strong prescriptions: "his students said that one should let him diagnose but not treat the patient".

He was always at the 'leading edge' of his profession: he was one of the first in Britain to use and promote the stethoscope, and one of the first to use acupuncture.

Education 
The son of the prosperous London chemist and apothecary John Elliotson and Elizabeth Elliotson, he was born in Southwark on 29 October 1791.

He was a private pupil of the rector of St Saviours, Southwark, and went on to study medicine at the University of Edinburgh, from 1805 to 1810 — where he was influenced by Thomas Brown, M.D. (1778–1820) — and then at Jesus College, Cambridge, from 1810 to 1821), from both of which institutions he took the degree of M.D., and subsequently in London at St Thomas' and Guy's hospitals. In 1831 he was elected professor of the principles and practice of physic in London University (now University College London), and in 1834 he became physician to University College Hospital.

Physical characteristics 
Barely 5 ft (152 cm) tall, with dark complexion and a very large head, he was also lame (following an 1828 carriage accident).

His appearance presented a strong contrast to his 'intramural enemy' Robert Liston (1794-1847), F.R.C.S. (Edinburgh, 1818), F.R.S. (1841), the University College's Professor of Clinical Surgery, one of the fastest surgeons of all time (on one occasion Liston amputated a leg, mid-thigh, in 25 seconds), who was pale skinned, and at least 6 ft 2in (188 cm) tall. Liston was fiercely opposed to Elliotson's 'contamination' of the hospital with his demonstrations of 'higher states' of mesmerism (i.e., rather than its 'medical' applications).

Despite his unusual physical characteristics, Elliotson was greatly admired as a lecturer, both for the structured clarity of his lectures, and the theatrical liveliness of their delivery. Once he began lecturing at the University College, his widely respected lectures were extensively reported in the medical press; and he published a number of collections of his lectures over the years. At his peak, he was the first President of the Royal Medical and Chirurgical Society (in 1833), a fellow of the Royal College of Physicians and the Royal Society, he had one of the largest private practices in London and, at his peak, was one of the pre-eminent physicians in the entire British Empire.

Phrenology and Mesmerism 
He became interested in phrenology, and was founder and first President of the London Phrenological Society (in 1823). His interest in mesmerism had been aroused initially by the demonstrations conducted by Richard Chenevix in 1829, and re-awakened by Dupotet de Sennevoy's demonstrations in 1837.

The Okey sisters 
This prompted Elliotson to begin experimenting with the Okey sisters, Elizabeth (17) and Jane (15), who had been admitted to his hospital, in April 1837, for treatment of their epilepsy. Their surname was often given as O'Key and it was and is widely assumed they were Irish but in fact they came from an old English family (Okey comes from the oak tree). Elliotson soon began using them as subjects – in 1837 he inserted "a large seton needle with a skein of silk into it", entirely painlessly, and without her even being aware that such a penetration had taken place, into the neck of Elizabeth Okey (the older sister) whilst she was mesmerized — within the confines of the hospital, in public demonstrations of the so-called 'higher states' of mesmerism: clairvoyance, transposition of the senses (seeing with the fingers, etc.), thought transmission, physical rapport or "community of sensation", psychical rapport, etc. Convinced that the elder sister, Elizabeth, had a talent for medical clairvoyance (able to see into the body, diagnose illness, prescribe treatment, and deliver a prognosis), Elliotson took her down into the wards in the dead of night and had her both diagnose and prescribe treatments.

Thomas Wakley 
In August 1838, Thomas Wakley conducted a series of experiments on the sisters in front of several witnesses. His tests focussed on whether the girls could tell 'mesmerised' from 'unmesmerised' water. When they failed to do this consistently, he denounced them as frauds and proclaimed mesmerism a complete fallacy. In fact, the experiments did not prove the girls were faking nor did they show that mesmerism was false. By the end of 1838, however, Elliotson was forced to resign from the hospital. The Council of the University College, after months of deliberation, passed a resolution on 27 December 1838, "That the Hospital Committee be instructed to take such steps as they shall deem most advisable, to prevent the practice of Mesmerism or Animal Magnetism within the Hospital"; and Elliotson, on reading the contents of the resolution, resigned all of his appointments forthwith.

Wakley did all that he could, as editor of The Lancet, and as an individual, to oppose Elliotson, and to place all of his endeavours and enterprises in the worst possible light; for example, in addition to an extensive range of articles in The Lancet, over a number of years, there is also an anti-Elliotson (pseudonymous) work attributed to Wakley, Undeniable facts concerning the strange practices of Dr. Elliotson, ... with his female patients; and his medical experiments upon the bodies of ... E. & J. Okey, etc. (1842) which is held by the British Library, and another, most likely written by either Wakley or one of his associates, held in the collection of the Wellcome Library (see right).

The Zoist

Elliotson and William Collins Engledue were the co-editors of The Zoist: A Journal of Cerebral Physiology & Mesmerism, and Their Applications to Human Welfare, an influential British journal, devoted to the promotion of the theories and practices (and the collection and dissemination of reports of the applications) of mesmerism and phrenology, and the enterprise of "connecting and harmonizing practical science with little understood laws governing the mental structure of man", that was published quarterly, without a break, for fifteen years: from March 1843 until January 1856.

The Zoist, was printed on high quality paper, and issued quarterly to its subscribers. It was also published for a wider readership in annual volumes. Well-written in crisp, scientific English, it was devoted to the propagation of information about the applications of phrenology (rather than its theories) and to the collection, storage, and dissemination of reports of the therapeutic efficacy of mesmerism (with even less treatment of mesmeric theories than of phrenological theories) – in part, it acted as a disciplinary clearing house for information and the experiences of both amateur and professional practitioners (and their subjects) from all over Great Britain, and its colonies – and it placed great stress on the well-demonstrated usefulness of mesmerism, not only in the alleviation of disease and suffering, but in the provision of pain-free surgery, especially amputations.

Harveian Oration 
In 1846 – by this stage bereft of all his institutional affiliations – and despite many earnest efforts made to prevent him doing so, as the Royal College of Physicians' youngest fellow, Elliotson delivered the Harveian Oration to the Royal College of Physicians of London, in which he controversially spoke of how William Harvey, the man whom the Oration was honouring, had been forced to fight against the entrenched conservatism of the medical profession and its initial incredulity and resistance to his discoveries, and stressed the strength of the analogy with the current (equally misguided and ignorant) critics of mesmerism.

Mesmeric Infirmary 
Elliotson continued to provide mesmeric demonstrations from his own residence at 37 Conduit Street, Hanover Square (which he eventually quit in 1865). In partnership with Engledue, he began publishing The Zoist in 1843, and, in 1849 founded the London Mesmeric Infirmary. As his reputation rapidly declined, his once lucrative practice also disappeared, and he died, penniless, in 1868 in the London home of a medical colleague, Edmond Sheppard Symes (1805-1881), L.S.A. (1830), M.R.C.S (England, 1832), M.D. (Aberdeen, 1851).

Literary connections 
He was highly regarded in literary circles. WM Thackeray's Pendennis was dedicated to his friend, Elliotson; and the character, Dr Goodenough (in Thackeray's last novel, The Adventures of Philip (1862), was based on Elliotson, who had attended Thackeray when suffered a life-threatening illness in 1849.

Elliotson was a friend of Charles Dickens, and introduced Dickens to Mesmerism. Wilkie Collins, a close friend of Dickens described Elliotson as "one of the greatest English physiologists," and cites an example of state-dependent memory from Elliotson's Human Physiology in The Moonstone.

Works 

 1817: Elliotson, J. (trans.), Blumenbach, J.F., The Institutions of Physiology (Institutiones Physiologicæ.
 1820: Elliotson, J., Numerous Cases Illustrative of the Efficacy of the Hydrocyanic Or Prussic Prussic Acid in Affections of the Stomach., etc., Longman, Hurst, Rees, Orme, and Brown, (London), 1820.
 1827: Elliotson, J., "The Use of the Sulphate of Copper in Chronic Diarrhoea, to which are added some Observations on the use of Acupuncture in Rheumatism", Medico-Chirurgical Transactions, Vol.13, Part 2, (1827), pp. 451–468.
 1830: Elliotson, J., On the Recent Improvements in the Art of Distinguishing the Various Diseases of the Heart, etc.,  Longman, Rees, Orme, Brown, and Green, (London), 1830.
 1832: Elliotson, J., "Acupuncture", pp. 32–34 in Forbes, J., Tweedie, A. & Conolly, J. (eds), The Cyclopædia of Practical Medicine: Comprising Treatises on the Nature and Treatment of Diseases, Materia Medica and Therapeutics, Medical Jurisprudence, etc. etc., Volume I (Abd-Ele), Sherwood, Gilbert, and Piper, (London), 1832.
 1835: Elliotson, J., Human Physiology, Longman, Rees, Orme, Brown, Green & Longman, (London), 1835.
 1839: Elliotson, J. and Rogers, N., The Principles and Practice of Medicine, etc., Joseph Butler, (London), 1839.
 1843: Elliotson, J., Numerous Cases of Surgical Operations without Pain in the Mesmeric state, with Remarks upon the Opposition of many Members of the Royal Medical and Chirurgical Society and others to the Reception of the Inestimable Blessings of Mesmerism, H. Ballière, (London), 1843.
 1843: Engledue, W.C., Cerebral Physiology and Materialism, with the Result of the Application of Animal Magnetism to the Cerebral Organs: An Address delivered to the Phrenological Association in London, June 20, 1842, by W. C. Engledue, M.D.; With a Letter from Dr Elliotson, On Mesmeric Phrenology and Materialism, J. Watson, (London), 1843.
 1844: Elliotson, J, "Case of Epilepsy Cured by Mesmerism", The Zoist: A Journal of Cerebral Physiology & Mesmerism, and Their Applications to Human Welfare, Vol.2, No.6, (July 1844), pp. 194–238.
 1846: Elliotson, J., The Harveian Oration, Delivered before the Royal College of Physicians, London 1846, by John Elliotson, M.D. Cantab. F.R.S., Fellow of the College, With an English Version and Notes, (1846).
 1855: Elliotson, J., "An Instance of Sleep and Cure by Imagination only", The Zoist: A Journal of Cerebral Physiology & Mesmerism, and Their Applications to Human Welfare, Vol.12, No.48, (January 1855), pp. 396–403.

In popular culture 
Elliotson is a major antagonist in the game Assassin's Creed: Syndicate, who performs brutal and fatal experiments on the insane at Lambeth Asylum and is a secret member of the Templar Order. He is later killed by the Master Assassin Jacob Frye.

See also 
 The Zoist: A Journal of Cerebral Physiology & Mesmerism, and Their Applications to Human Welfare

Footnotes

References 

 "Elliotson, John", p.404 in Venn, J. & Venn, J.A. (eds), Alumni Cantabrigienses: A Biographical List of All Known Students, Graduates and Holders of Office at the University of Cambridge, from the Earliest Times to 1900, Volume 2 (1752-1900), Part 2 (Chalmers-Fytche), Cambridge University Press, (Cambridge), 1944.
 Anon, "The Elliotson Legend", The British Medical Journal, Vol.2, No.2654, (11 November 1911), pp. 1313–1314.
 Clarke, J.F., "A Strange Chapter in the History of Medicine", pp. 155–169 in [1874], Clarke, J.F., Autobiographical Recollections of the Medical Profession, J. & A. Churchill, (London,), 1874.
 Collyer, R.H., Psychography, or, The Embodiment of Thought: With an Analysis of Phreno-magnetism, "Neurology", and Mental Hallucination, Including Rules to Govern and Produce the Magnetic State, Zeiber & Co., (Philadelphia), 1843.
 Cooter, R.J., "Phrenology and British Alienists, c.1825-1845, Part I: Converts to a Doctrine", Medical History, Vol. 20, No.1, (January 1976), pp. 1–21. doi=10.1017/S0025727300021761
 Cooter, R.J., "Phrenology and British Alienists, c.1825-1845, Part II: Doctrine and Practice", Medical History, Vol.20, No.2, (April 1976), pp. 135–151. doi=10.1017/S0025727300022195
 Cooter, R. J., The Cultural Meaning of Popular Science: Phrenology and the Organization of Consent in Nineteenth-Century Britain, Cambridge University Press, (Cambridge), 1984.
 Gauld, A., A History of Hypnotism, Cambridge University Press, (Cambridge), 1992
 Gauld, A., "Elliotson, John (1791-1868)", pp. 192–193 in Matthew, H.C.G. & Harrison, B.H. (eds.), Oxford Dictionary of National Biography: In Association with the British Academy: from the Earliest Times to the Year 2000, Oxford University Press, (Oxford), 2004.
 Godwin, J., The Theosophical Enlightenment, State University of New York Press, (Albany), 1994.
 Harte, R., Hypnotism and the Doctors, Volume I: Animal Magnetism: Mesmer/De Puysegur, L.N. Fowler & Co., (London), 1902. 
 Harte, R., Hypnotism and the Doctors, Volume II: The Second Commission; Dupotet And Lafontaine; The English School; Braid's Hypnotism; Statuvolism; Pathetism; Electro-Biology, L.N. Fowler & Co., (London), 1903.
 James, C.D., "Mesmerism: a Prelude to Anaesthesia", Proceedings of the Royal Society of Medicine, Vol.68, No.7, (July 1975), pp. 446–447.
 Kaplan, F., John Elliotson on Mesmerism, Da Capo Press, (New York), 1982.
 "Mesmeric Amputation", Medico-Chirurgical Review, and Journal of Practical Medicine, No.75, (1 January 1843), pp. 280–282. 
 
 Ridgway, E.S., "John Elliotson (1791-1868): A Bitter Enemy of Legitimate Medicine? Part I: Earlier Years and the Introduction to Mesmerism", Journal of Medical Biography, Vol.1, No.4, (November 1993), pp. 191–198.
 Ridgway, E.S., "John Elliotson (1791-1868): A Bitter Enemy of Legitimate Medicine? Part II: The Mesmeric Scandal and Later Years", Journal of Medical Biography, Vol.2, No.1, (February 1994), pp. 1–7.
 Rosen, G., "John Elliotson: Physician and Hypnotist", Bulletin of the Institute of the History of Medicine, Vol.4, (1936), pp. 600–603.
 Rosen, G., "Mesmerism and Surgery: A Strange Chapter in the History of Anesthesia", Journal of the History of Medicine and Allied Sciences, Vol.1, No.4, (October 1946), pp. 527–550. doi=10.1093/jhmas/1.4.527
 Ruth, J., "'Gross Humbug' or 'The Language of Truth'? The Case of the Zoist", Victorian Periodicals Review, Vol.32, No.4, (Winter 1999), pp. 299–323.
 Savage, G.H, The Harveian Oration on Experimental Psychology and Hypnotism Delivered before the Royal College of Physicians of London, October 18, 1909, Henry Frowde, (London), 1909.
 Schneck, J.M., "John Elliotson, William Makepeace Thackeray, and Doctor Goodenough", International Journal of Clinical and Experimental Hypnosis, Vol.11, No.2, (April 1963), pp. 122–130. doi=10.1080/00207146308409236
 Topham, W. & Ward, W.S., Account of a Case of Successful Amputation of the Thigh, During the Mesmeric State, Without the Knowledge of the Patient. Read to the Royal Medical and Chirurgical Society of London on Tuesday 22nd November, 1842, H. Baillière, (London), 1842.
 Warburton, H., 602. Report from the Select Committee on Medical Education: With the Minutes of Evidence, and Appendix, Part I: Royal College of Physicians, London, House of Commons, (Parliament of Great Britain), 1834.
 Wheeler, J.M., "Elliotson (John, M.D., FRS)", pp. 120–121 in Wheeler, J.M., A Biographical Dictionary of Freethinkers of All Ages and Nations, Progressive Publishing Company, (London), 1889.
 Winter, A., Mesmerized: Powers of Mind in Victorian Britain, The University of Chicago Press, (Chicago), 1998.
 Yeates, L.B., James Braid: Surgeon, Gentleman Scientist, and Hypnotist, Ph.D. Dissertation, School of History and Philosophy of Science, Faculty of Arts & Social Sciences, University of New South Wales, January 2013.

External links

Student Record for John Elliotson -- University of Edinburgh, Centre for Research Collections, Individual Records, Students of Medicine (1762–1826)
 Elliotson's (1810) M.D. graduation record: "Jo. Elliotson, Anglus. De inflammation" ("John Elliotson, England. [Title of inaugural dissertation]: Inflammation") – University of Edinburgh (1867), p.42.
Elliotson's entry in the first edition of the British Medical Directory (1853), The Lancet (1853)
Elliotson's (greatly diminished in size) entry in the second edition of the British Medical Directory (1854)—The Lancet (1854)
Elliotson's entry in the first edition of The Medical Register  (1860)—The General Medical Council (1859).  This entry verifies that Elliotson was registered (as of 1 January 1859, the first day of the registration system) as a practitioner under the Medical Act 1858.

1791 births
1868 deaths
19th-century English medical doctors
British magazine founders
Animal magnetism
Phrenologists
Alumni of the University of Edinburgh
Alumni of Jesus College, Cambridge
Academics of University College London
Fellows of the Royal Society
19th-century British businesspeople
Committee members of the Society for the Diffusion of Useful Knowledge